Deniliquin High School is a government-funded co-educational comprehensive secondary day school, located in , a town in the Riverina region of New South Wales, Australia.

The school enrolled approximately 480 students in 2018, from Year 7 to Year 12, of whom ten percent identified as Indigenous Australians and three percent were from a language background other than English. The school is operated by the NSW Department of Education; the principal is Glen Warren.

This school's strategic directions are oriented towards quality teaching, by developing a teaching and learning culture towards students; leadership engagement, by consolidating the leadership capacity of students and teachers; and positive relationship, creating positive relationship between the school and the stakeholders.

See also 

 List of government schools in New South Wales
 List of schools in the Riverina
 Education in Australia

References

External links
 
 NSW Schools website

Public high schools in New South Wales
Education in the Riverina
Deniliquin